The Journal of Investigative Dermatology is a peer-reviewed medical journal covering dermatology. It has been published by Elsevier since 2016 and the editor-in-chief is Mark C. Udey (Washington University School of Medicine).

Abstracting and indexing
The journal is abstracted and indexed in:

According to the Journal Citation Reports, the journal has a 2020 impact factor of 8.551.

References

External links

Dermatology journals
Publications established in 1938
Elsevier academic journals
Monthly journals
English-language journals